Karl Edvin Öhrström (August 22, 1906 in Burlöv – December 2, 1994) was a Swedish sculptor and glass artist.

Öhrström grew up in Halmstad, where his father worked at the railroad. He started to work as a railroad worker, he trained to become an art teacher at Tekniska skolan (current Konstfack) in Stockholm 1925–1928, and at the sculptural department at the Royal University College of Fine Arts 1928–1931, with Carl Milles and Nils Sjögren as teachers. In 1932, in Paris, France. From 1932 to 1957, he worked two months per year at Orrefors Glasbruk in Småland. He often used the ariel technique, which he had invented together with the master Gustaf Bergkvist and the artist Vicke Lindstrand. Later, he worked at Lindshammars Glasbruk, where he developed his sculptures to prisms of gemstone colors that played with light reflections and refractions in the glass.

Edvin Öhrstrom won a contest for the decoration of Sergels torg in Stockholm, with a 37.5 metres high steel construction with 80 000 glass prisms, lit from within. This 130 tonnes heavy glass pillar, Kristallvertikalaccent, is made from steel and covered with glass from Lindshammars Glasbruk and was inaugurated in 1974. The light source is four lamps inside the pillar.

He was awarded the Prince Eugen Medal for sculpture in 1979.

References

Notes 

1906 births
1994 deaths
People from Burlöv Municipality
Swedish male sculptors
20th-century sculptors
Recipients of the Prince Eugen Medal